In metadata, Naming and Design Rules are the formal rules associated with how data elements are structured within a process of creating exchange documents between organizations.

Naming and Design Rules are a set of guidelines and naming conventions that go beyond what a single data exchange standard specification will permit.  The most common standard that Naming and Design Rules are created on is XML Schema.  For example, the use of upper camel case data element names is a convention used in many standard but is not specified by the XML Schema specification.

Naming and Design Rules have become an important aspect of each organizations data exchange standards.  Within the United States, Naming and Design Rules standards are recommended for each federal and state agency.

See also 
 metadata
 XML
 XML Schema

References 

 National Information Exchange Model Naming and Design Rules NIEM Technical Architecture Committee (NTAC) October 31, 2008 Version 1.3 
 National Information Exchange Model Version 1.2 Aug. 7th 2007 
 GJXDM Naming and Design Rules used by the US Department of Justice 
 Powerpoint presentation to federal agencies on Naming and Design Rules 
 Infostructurebase Naming and Design Rules that are part of the Danish e-Government Project 
 UN/EDIFACT Naming and Design Rules 

Metadata